Walker School District No. 33 or Walker Public Schools (WPS) was a school district headquartered in Columbia County, Arkansas. It operated the Walker School.

On July 1, 2004, it consolidated with the Magnolia School District.

References

Further reading
 (Download) - Map of the district

External links
 
 Walker School District No. 33 Columbia County, Arkansas Basic Financial Statements and Other Reports June 30, 2004 
 Walker School District No. 33 Columbia County, Arkansas General Purpose Financial Statements  and Other Reports June 30, 2002 

Education in Columbia County, Arkansas
Defunct school districts in Arkansas
2004 disestablishments in Arkansas
School districts disestablished in 2004